Michelle Knox-Zaloom (born November 17, 1964) is an American former rower. She competed in a quad and came in first at the 1991 Pan American Games. She competed in a quad at the 1992 Summer Olympics and a double in the 1996 Summer Olympics.

References

External links
 

1964 births
Living people
American female rowers
Olympic rowers of the United States
Rowers at the 1992 Summer Olympics
Rowers at the 1996 Summer Olympics
People from Anne Arundel County, Maryland
Pan American Games medalists in rowing
Pan American Games gold medalists for the United States
Pan American Games silver medalists for the United States
Rowers at the 1991 Pan American Games
Rowers at the 1995 Pan American Games
21st-century American women
Medalists at the 1991 Pan American Games